Hasan Corso (born Pietro Paolo Tavera) was the mayor of Algiers and caliph of Salah Rais.

Corso was born on the island of Corsica. When he was five years old, he was taken and sent away to Istanbul, and was introduced to the Janissaries. There, he was educated in the Muslim religion, Turkish language and given military education. At the end of these years, the Turkish gave him the name Hassan Corso, and sent him to Algiers. He rapidly rose through the ranks and earned the title of Agha. One of his principal lieutenants was a European convert to Islam as well, and hailing from Corso's neighbouring island of Sardinia, Ali "Sardo".

In 1549, he became mayor of Algiers and caliph of Salah Rais. He was murdered in August, 1556, at the age of 38 on the orders of a pasha sent from Istanbul.

References

Military personnel of the Ottoman Empire
1556 deaths
People from Corsica
Mayors of Algiers
1510s births
16th-century people from the Ottoman Empire
Algerian people of French descent
16th century in Algiers
Converts to Islam from Christianity